Oliver Abraham Saksak (born 20 December 1960) is a Vanuatuan judge who has sat on the Supreme Court of Vanuatu since May 1997.

Early life 
He hails from Ambrym in Malampa Province.

Rulings 
He put a stay on Gracia Shadracks ruling as speaker of the Parliament until a court could formally consider the dispute. He sentenced former minister Esmon Saimon in December 2021.

References 

1960 births
Living people
Supreme Court of Vanuatu judges
Alumni of the University of Oxford

People from Malampa Province